Cytochrome b5, form A (gene name CYB5A), is a human microsomal cytochrome b5.

Cytochrome b5 is a membrane bound hemoprotein which functions as an electron carrier for several membrane bound oxygenases. It has two isoforms produced by alternative splicing. Isoform 1 is bound to the cytoplasmic side of the endoplasmic reticulum. It has a C-terminal transmembrane alpha-helix. Isoform 2 was found in cytoplasm. Defects in CYB5A are the cause of type IV hereditary methemoglobinemia.

References

Further reading

Transmembrane proteins